This is a list of events in animation in 2021.

Events

January 
 January 3: The first episode of The Great North is broadcast.
 January 15:
 HBO Max added its "Animation" landing page.
 The first ten episodes of Disenchantment season 2 are released on Netflix.
 January 25: Disney+ removes Dumbo, Peter Pan, and The Aristocats, from their kids profiles due to certain scenes containing old-fashioned racial stereotypes. They remain available to adult viewers.
 January 26: Go, Dog. Go! premiered on Netflix.

February 
 February 2: Kid Cosmic premiered on Netflix.
 February 9: Disney shuts down Blue Sky Studios due to current "economic realities" related to the COVID-19 pandemic.
 February 15: Pop singer Gala releases a music video, Parallel Lines, with animation by Nina Paley.
 February 17: Cartoon Network announced a film for The Amazing World of Gumball.
 February 22: Voice actor Harry Shearer announces he will no longer voice the African-American character Dr. Hibbert on The Simpsons, being replaced by Kevin Michael Richardson starting with the episode "Wad Goals".
 February 23: Monster High was announced to come back with a live-action film and animated series on Nickelodeon.
 February 26: Tom and Jerry was released simultaneously in theaters and on HBO Max.

March 
 March 1: Qubo is discontinued along with Ion Plus and Ion Shop.
 March 4: The SpongeBob Movie: Sponge on the Run and Kamp Koral: SpongeBob's Under Years were released with the launch of Paramount+.
 March 5: Raya and the Last Dragon was released simultaneously in theaters and on Disney+.
 March 6:
 New York Times Columnist, Charles M. Blow, claims that the Looney Tunes character Pepé Le Pew, "normalized rape culture". Following the publication of the article, it was reported that he was cut out of Space Jam: A New Legacy after Malcolm D. Lee took over directing. The character was reported to not be slated in current and future Warner Bros. projects. However, he appeared in the Animaniacs reboot episode, "Yakko Amakko" which premiered on November 5, 2021.
 Amphibia resumes its second season.
 March 10: South Park releases another pandemic special.
 March 15: The DuckTales series finale, a three-part episode titled "The Last Adventure!", premieres.
 March 21: 
 The 700th episode of The Simpsons, "Manger Things", premiered. The couch gag is animated by Bill Plympton.
 Lebanese animated feature Alephia 2053 released on YouTube and streaming platforms.
 March 26: The SpongeBob SquarePants episode "Mid-Life Crustacean" was removed and made unavailable to stream on Paramount+ due to the panty raid scene, while "Kwarantined Krab" is delayed due to similarities to the COVID-19 pandemic. The episode would eventually air on April 29, 2022.
 March 29:
 The first episode of an animated series based on Pieter De Poortere's gag comic Boerke (in English: Dickie) airs on television.
 101 Dalmatian Street makes its US cable television premiere.

April 
 April 7: Cartoon Network Studios Europe is rebranded as Hanna-Barbera Studios Europe.
 April 10: Blue Sky Studios closes down.
 April 12: The season 2 finale of Bluey titled, "Easter", premieres to universal acclaim.
 April 16: Netflix Animation releases Arlo the Alligator Boy.
 April 25: 93rd Academy Awards: 
Soul, directed by Pete Docter and Dana Murray, produced by Pixar, wins the Academy Award for Best Animated Feature. Its soundtrack, composed by Trent Reznor, Atticus Ross and Jon Batiste, wins the Academy Award for Best Original Score.
 If Anything Happens I Love You, directed by Michael Govier and Will McCormack, won the Academy Award for Best Animated Short Film.
 April 23: Mike Rianda's debut film The Mitchells vs. the Machines, produced by Sony Pictures Animation, is released on Netflix.

May 
 May 17: Deadline Hollywood reported that The Owl House was renewed for a third season comprising three 44-minute specials, ahead of the premiere of the second season the following month.
 May 22: The second-season finale of Amphibia, "True Colors", is finally released three weeks after being delayed and subsequently leaked by iTunes.
 May 31: The first episode of HouseBroken is broadcast.

June 
 June 7: The Molly of Denali season one finale, a one-hour special titled "Molly and the Great One", premiered on PBS Kids.
 June 11: 
 Sony Pictures Animation releases Wish Dragon, written and directed by Chris Appelhans.
 Rainbow High premieres its season 1 finale on YouTube.
 June 12: The second season of The Owl House premieres.
 June 18: Luca premiered on Disney+ instead of being released theatrically in the United States.

July 
 July 2: The Boss Baby: Family Business was released simultaneously in theaters and on Peacock.
 July 16: 
 A revival of Johnny Test premiered on Netflix.
 Space Jam: A New Legacy was released simultaneously in theaters and on HBO Max.
 Rainbow High premieres the first episode of its second season.
 July 30: Kirk DeMicco's Vivo, produced by Sony Pictures Animation, premiers. It marks Sony Pictures Animation's first musical film. The film is later officially released on Netflix on August 6, 2022.
 July 31: The Owl House episode titled, "Knock, Knock, Knockin' on Hooty's Door" premieres to critical acclaim. In it, the characters Luz and Amity begin officially dating, making them one of the few explicitly queer couples in a Disney animated series.

August 
 August 1: The third series of Bluey premieres to critical acclaim.
 August 11: What If...?, an animated anthology series produced by Marvel Studios, premiered on Disney+.
 August 20: 
PAW Patrol: The Movie was released simultaneously in theaters and on Paramount+.
The Loud House Movie, a feature film based on The Loud House, is first released on Netflix.
August 27: I Heart Arlo is first released on Netflix.

September 
 September 13: The preschool block Cartoonito was released on Cartoon Network and HBO Max.
 September 18: After 18 years, Family Guy officially leaves Adult Swim.
 September 21: The Amazing World of Gumball gets a new series and greenlit film, with Ben Bocquelet returning to the franchise.
 September 26: Fox Television Animation was renamed as 20th Television Animation.

October 
 October 1: The Ghost and Molly McGee premieres.
 October 2: The third and final season of Amphibia premieres.
 October 4: Alma's Way premieres on PBS Kids.
 October 10: Animaniacs reveals a sneak peek of the show's upcoming second season at New York Comic Con during a virtual event and is later released on YouTube by Hulu.
 October 16: Michael Caine, British actor (voice of Lord Redbrick in Gnomeo & Juliet and Sherlock Gnomes, and Finn McMissile in Cars 2) announced that, contrary to reports of the previous day, he was not retiring from acting.
 October 22: 
 Ron's Gone Wrong, produced by Locksmith Animation is released in theaters.
 Maya and the Three premiered on Netflix.
 October 30: The pitch trailer for an animated series titled Pibby is released on YouTube. Creator Dodge Greenley said it may become a full series depending on the viewers' reactions, and the reception has been positive from fans and critics alike.

November 
 November 8: The final season of Squidbillies premiered.
 November 22: Reruns of King of the Hill returned on Adult Swim after losing the syndication rights in 2018.
 November 24: Walt Disney Animation Studios's 60th animated film Encanto was released to theaters.
November 25: South Park: Post COVID was released on Paramount+.
November 27: The season 3 mid-finale of Amphibia, "Froggy Little Christmas", premieres, with Rebecca Sugar guest-starring.
 November 29: The second season of Animaniacs premieres.

December 
 December 2: The miniseries Santa Inc. was released on HBO Max to critical disdain.
 December 4: The Bluey episode, "Pass The Parcel" airs to positive reviews, but sparked controversy due to the episode's message about competitive parenting.
 December 7: The second season of Go, Dog. Go! premieres on Netflix.
 December 13: Squidbillies airs its final episode.
 December 14: Flowers and Trees and WALL-E are inducted in the National Film Registry.
 December 15:
 Ron's Gone Wrong was released on both Digital, Disney+ and HBO Max.
 Rumble was released on Paramount+.
 December 16: South Park: Post COVID: The Return of COVID was released on Paramount+.
 December 19: Jay Johnston was confirmed to no longer be voicing Jimmy Pesto in Bob's Burgers due to his participation in the 2021 United States Capitol attack.
 December 23: After more than 14 years on the air, Comedy Central aired Futurama for the final time due to Adult Swim regaining the syndication rights from Comedy Central. However, the series was added back on May 2, 2022.
 December 24: Encanto was released on Disney+ 30 days after its theatrical release.
 December 27: Reruns of Futurama returned on Adult Swim since after losing the syndication rights to the series to Comedy Central in 2007.
 December 30: The movie special Hilda and the Mountain King based on Hilda premiered on Netflix to critical acclaim and positive reviews.

Awards 
 Academy Award for Best Animated Feature: Soul
 Academy Award for Best Animated Short Film: If Anything Happens I Love You
 American Cinema Editors Award for Best Edited Animated Feature Film: Soul
 Annecy International Animated Film Festival Cristal du long métrage: Calamity, a Childhood of Martha Jane Cannary
 Annie Award for Best Animated Feature: Soul
 Annie Award for Best Animated Feature—Independent: Wolfwalkers
 BAFTA Award for Best Animated Film: Soul
 César Award for Best Animated Film: Josep
 Chicago Film Critics Association Award for Best Animated Film: Wolfwalkers
 Dallas–Fort Worth Film Critics Association Award for Best Animated Film: Soul
 European Film Award for Best Animated Feature Film: Flee
 Florida Film Critics Circle Award for Best Animated Film: Soul
 Golden Globe Award for Best Animated Feature Film: Soul
 Golden Reel Awards: Soul
 Goya Award for Best Animated Film: Turu, the Wacky Hen
 Japan Academy Film Prize for Animation of the Year: Demon Slayer: Kimetsu no Yaiba the Movie: Mugen Train
 Kids' Choice Award for Favorite Animated Movie: Soul
 Los Angeles Film Critics Association Award for Best Animated Film: Wolfwalkers
 Mainichi Film Award for Best Animation Film: Looking for Magical Doremi
 National Board of Review Award for Best Animated Film: Soul
 New York Film Critics Circle Award for Best Animated Film: Wolfwalkers
 Online Film Critics Society Award for Best Animated Film: Soul
 Producers Guild of America Award for Best Animated Motion Picture: Soul
 San Diego Film Critics Society Award for Best Animated Film: Wolfwalkers
 San Francisco Film Critics Circle Award for Best Animated Feature: Soul
 Satellite Award for Best Animated or Mixed Media Feature: Wolfwalkers
 Saturn Award for Best Animated Film: Onward
 St. Louis Gateway Film Critics Association Award for Best Animated Film: Soul
 Tokyo Anime Award: Violet Evergarden: The Movie
 Toronto Film Critics Association Award for Best Animated Film: Wolfwalkers
 Visual Effects Society Award for Outstanding Visual Effects in an Animated Feature: Soul
 Washington D.C. Area Film Critics Association Award for Best Animated Feature: Soul

Films released

Television series debuts

Television series endings

Deaths

January
 January 2: Aylin Özmenek, Turkish animator, dies at age 78–79.
 January 3: Daniel de la Vega, American animator (Ruby-Spears Enterprises, Hanna-Barbera, Filmation, Tiny Toon Adventures, Shelley Duvall's Bedtime Stories), sheet timer (Tiny Toon Adventures, Disney Television Animation, The Pink Panther, Mad Jack the Pirate, Xyber 9: New Dawn, Nickelodeon Animation Studio, Tutenstein, The Secret Saturdays) and director (Wild West C.O.W.-Boys of Moo Mesa, Belle's Magical World, Danny Phantom, My Life as a Teenage Robot), dies at an unknown age.
 January 5: David Saire, English actor (additional voices in Courage the Cowardly Dog), dies at age 90.
 January 7: 
 Dave Creek, American animator (Happiness Is a Warm Blanket, Charlie Brown) and character designer (Bob's Burgers, Brickleberry, Central Park, The Great North), dies in a skydiving accident at age 43.
 Marion Ramsey, American actress and singer (voice of D.I. Holler in The Addams Family, Laverne Hooks and Teacher in the Robot Chicken episode "Sausage Fest"), dies at age 73.
 Val Bettin, American actor (voice of Dr. David Dawson in The Great Mouse Detective, the Sultan in the Aladdin franchise, Bishop in Shrek), dies at age 97.
 January 9: Antón Cancelas, Spanish voice actor (Spanish dub of Saint Seiya), dies at age 65.
 January 13: Siegfried Fischbacher, German-American magician, entertainer and producer (Father of the Pride), dies from pancreatic cancer at age 81.
 January 14: Peter Mark Richman, American actor (voice of The Phantom in Defenders of the Earth, Winchell in the Batman Beyond episode "Inqueling", Abin Sur in the Superman: The Animated Series episode "In Brightest Day...", Charles Baxter in the Batman: The Animated Series episode "Riddler's Reform"), dies at age 93.
 January 15: Dale Baer, American animator (Walt Disney Animation Studios, The Lord of the Rings, Peanuts specials, Rover Dangerfield, Tom and Jerry: The Movie, Quest for Camelot, Eric Goldberg couch gag in The Simpsons episode "Fland Canyon", Tom and Jerry: Willy Wonka and the Chocolate Factory) and storyboard artist (Hanna-Barbera, Mother Goose and Grimm, Animaniacs, The King and I), dies from complications from amyotrophic lateral sclerosis at age 70.
 January 16: Jim MacGeorge, American voice actor (voice of Captain Huffenpuff, Beany Boy and Crowy in Beany and Cecil, Oliver Hardy in Laurel & Hardy), dies at age 92.
 January 18: David Richardson, American television writer and producer (The Simpsons, F Is for Family), dies from heart failure at age 65.
 January 20: Mira Furlan, Croatian-born American actress and singer (voice of Silver Sable in Spider-Man, Babette in Arcane), dies from west nile virus at age 65.
 January 22:
 Ron Campbell, Australian film director, producer (Ron Campbell Films, Inc.) and animator (Hanna-Barbera, Disney Television Animation, Nickelodeon Animation Studio, The Beatles, Yellow Submarine, Sesame Street, Duckman), dies at age 81.
 Hank Aaron, American professional baseball player (voiced himself in the Futurama episode "A Leela of Her Own"), dies at age 86.
 January 23: 
 Hal Holbrook, American actor (voice of Amphitryon in Hercules, Cranston in Cats Don't Dance, Mayday in Planes: Fire & Rescue), dies at age 95. 
 Larry King, American actor and radio host (voice of Doris the Ugly Stepsister in Shrek, Wax Larry King in Gravity Falls, himself in The Simpsons episodes "One Fish, Two Fish, Blowfish, Blue Fish" and "Sideshow Bob Roberts" and the Arthur episode "Elwood City Turns 100!", and Bee Movie), dies at age 87.
 January 25: Ron Rodecker, American educator and artist (creator of Dragon Tales), dies from heart disease at age 90.
 January 27: Cloris Leachman, American actress and comedian (voice of Hydia in My Little Pony: The Movie, Gran in The Croods franchise, Granny Goodness in Justice League Action, Old Female Airplane Passenger in Beavis and Butt-Head Do America, Mrs. Tensedge in The Iron Giant, Anne Doofenshmirtz in Phineas and Ferb, Old Marceline in Adventure Time, Dola in Castle in the Sky, Mrs. Glick in The Simpsons episode "Three Men and a Comic Book"), dies at age 94.
 January 29: Walker Boone, Canadian actor (voice of Mario in The Adventures of Super Mario Bros. 3 and Super Mario World, Peppy Wolfman in Totally Spies! The Movie, Farmer in Daisy, A Hen into the Wild), dies at age 76.
 January 30:
 Marc Wilmore, American television writer (The Simpsons, The PJs, F Is for Family), producer, actor and comedian (voice of Psychologist and the Narrator in The Simpsons episodes "It's a Mad, Mad, Mad, Mad Marge" and "The Wreck of the Relationship", Walter Burkett in The PJs, Teddy Morewill in F Is for Family, additional voices in Teacher's Pet), dies from COVID-19 at age 57.
 Allan Burns, American television producer and writer (Jay Ward Productions), dies from Parkinson's disease and lewy body dementia at age 85.

February 
 February 1:
 Dustin Diamond, American actor and comedian (voice of Chubby Kid in Yogi's Great Escape, Screech Powers in Saved by the Bell, Gilbert Lowell and Employee in Robot Chicken, Xainius in Duck Dodgers), dies at age 44.
 Mac Torres, American animator (Pac-Man, Who Framed Roger Rabbit, Jetsons: The Movie, Teenage Mutant Ninja Turtles, Dino Babies, Space Jam), dies from parkinson's disease at age 67.
 Ángel Izquierdo, Spanish animator (Hanna-Barbera, The Charlie Brown and Snoopy Show, Asterix, Benjamin Blümchen, Pippi Longstocking), storyboard artist (Hurricanes) and director (Dragon Hill, la colina del dragón, The Magic Cube, RH+, the Vampire of Seville, Dragon Guardians, founder of Milimetros), dies at an unknown age.
 February 4: Polly Lou Livingston, American actress (voice of Tree Trunks in Adventure Time and Adventure Time: Distant Lands, Slippy Napkins in Bravest Warriors), dies at age 91.
 February 5: Christopher Plummer, Canadian actor (voice of Charles Muntz in Up, Henri le Pigeon in An American Tail, The Grand Duke of Owls in Rock-a-Doodle, narrator in Madeline), dies at age 91.
 February 7: Oscar González Loyo, Mexican animator and comics artist (made animated scenes for the Mexican version of Sesame Street: Plaza Sésamo), dies at age 61.
 February 8: Shūichirō Moriyama, Japanese voice actor (Japanese dub voice of Flotsam and Jetsam in The Little Mermaid, Percival C. McLeach in The Rescuers Down Under, Buford in Rango), dies at age 86.
 February 9: Vinnie Bell, American animator (Terrytoons, Schoolhouse Rock!, The Berenstain Bears specials, Harvey Birdman, Attorney at Law), dies at age 89.
 February 17:
 Rush Limbaugh, American conservative political commentator (voice of a Galactical Political Commentator and The Rancor in the Family Guy episodes "Blue Harvest" and "It's a Trap!", voiced himself in the Family Guy episode "Excellence in Broadcasting"), dies from lung cancer at age 70.
 Mitch Rochon, American animator (Hanna-Barbera, Heavy Metal, Fire and Ice, The Chipmunk Adventure), director (My Little Pony Tales, Belle's Magical World) and sheet timer (Disney Television Animation, Iznogoud, CatDog, Universal Animation Studios, Clifford's Really Big Movie, LeapFrog, Tutenstein, Avengers Assemble, Central Park), dies at age 72.
 February 20:
 Robert Schaefer, American background artist (Hanna-Barbera, The Nine Lives of Fritz the Cat, The Mouse and His Child, Ruby-Spears Enterprises, Heavy Metal, Marvel Productions, Fred Wolf Films, Alvin and the Chipmunks, The Real Ghostbusters, Warner Bros. Animation, Bucky O'Hare and the Toad Wars!, FernGully: The Last Rainforest, Universal Cartoon Studios, Wild West C.O.W.-Boys of Moo Mesa, Marvel Animation, Disney Television Animation), storyboard artist (Spider-Man and His Amazing Friends) and art director (Lady and the Tramp II: Scamp's Adventure), dies at age 82.
 Gisele Recinos, American animator (Who Framed Roger Rabbit, DreamWorks Animation), dies at an unknown age.
 February 23: Vladimir Zuykov, Russian animator and illustrator, (Film, Film, Film, Winnie-the-Pooh, About an Old Man, an Old Woman and Their Hen Ryaba), dies at age 86 from COVID-19.
 February 25: Masako Sugaya, Japanese voice actress (Aim for the Ace!, Nobody's Boy Remi, Perman, Urusei Yatsura), dies at age 83.
 February 27: Tasuku Saitō, Japanese animation producer (Gegege no Kitarō, Shōnen Ninja Kaze no Fujimaru, Tiger Mask), dies at age 87.

March 
 March 1: Arvo Nuut, Estonian film operator and film producer (Tallinnfilm, Nukufilm), dies at age 79.
 March 4: Jane Tucker, American animator (Walt Disney Animation Studios), dies at an unknown age.
 March 9: James Levine, American conductor (Fantasia 2000), dies at age 77.
 March 15: Yasuo Ōtsuka, Japanese animator (Panda and the Magic Serpent, Alakazam the Great, The Wonderful World of Puss 'n Boots, Lupin III), dies at age 89.
 March 16: Minako Shiba, Japanese animator and character designer (Noir, Black Butler, Hikaru no Go), dies at age 50.
 March 17: Jacques Frantz, French actor (voice of Obelix in Asterix and the Vikings), dies at age 73.
 March 19:
 Gary Leib, American cartoonist, musician and animator (founder of the animation studio Twinkle), dies at age 65–66.
 Richard Bowman, American animator, director (ChalkZone, Danny Phantom) and sheet timer (X-Men, The Simpsons, Jim Henson's Muppet Babies, Captain Planet and the Planeteers, Æon Flux, Men in Black: The Series, My Friends Tigger & Pooh), dies at age 70.
March 23: George Segal, American actor (voice of J.B. in Aaahh!!! Real Monsters, Eli in Adventures from the Book of Virtues, Dr. Benton C. Quest in The Real Adventures of Jonny Quest, Horror in Billy & Mandy's Big Boogey Adventure, Peter Trickell in Scooby-Doo! Mystery Incorporated, Bernie in American Dad!, Nick in The Simpsons, Dr. Eli Selig in The Zeta Project episode "Absolute Zero"), dies at age 87.
March 24: Jessica Walter, American actress (voice of Ashley Walker-Club-Dupree in The Magic School Bus, Demoness in The Life and Times of Juniper Lee, Old One in The Land Before Time, Malory Archer in Archer, Mrs. Wyatt in Scooby-Doo! Mystery Incorporated, Tabitha in Turbo: F.A.S.T., Miss Heinous in Star vs. the Forces of Evil, Granny Goodness in Harley Quinn, Athena in the Justice League Action episode "The Trouble With Truth"), dies at age 80.

April 
 April 4: Ralph Schuckett, American keyboardist, composer and songwriter (4Kids Entertainment), dies at age 73.
 April 9: DMX, American rapper and actor (voiced himself in the South Park episode "Chef Aid"), dies from a cocaine-induced heart attack at age 50.
 April 10: Edwin E. Aguilar, Salvadoran-American animator (The Simpsons, The Oblongs) and storyboard artist (The Simpsons, Brickleberry), dies from a stroke at age 46.
 April 15: Helen McCrory, American actress (voice of Mrs. Bean in Fantastic Mr. Fox, Lucy Fletcher in Phineas and Ferb), dies at age 52.
 April 17: 
 Osamu Kobayashi, Japanese animator, animation director and illustrator (Ani*Kuri15, Naruto, Grandia), dies at age 57.
 Felix Silla, American actor (additional voices in The Lord of the Rings), dies at age 84.
 April 19: Bunny Munns, American color key artist (Ruby-Spears Enterprises, Warner Bros. Animation, Toonsylvania) and ink & paint supervisor (Warner Bros. Animation), dies at an unknown age.
 April 20: Ana Lúcia Menezes, Brazilian actress (dub voice of Amy Rose in Sonic X and Sonic Boom, Margaret in Regular Show, Gwen Tennyson in Ben 10, Misa Amane in Death Note, Koto in Yu Yu Hakusho, Ikon Eron in Gormiti), dies from a stroke at age 46.
 April 21: Terry O'Reilley, Canadian layout artist (The Raccoons, The Adventures of Teddy Ruxpin, The Secret World of Benjamin Bear, Cyberchase, Wild Kratts, Atomic Puppet, Hilda, If You Give a Mouse a Cookie), dies at an unknown age.
 April 24: Shunsuke Kikuchi, Japanese composer (Doraemon, Dragon Ball, Dr. Slump, Getter Robo, Tiger Mask), dies at age 89.
 April 25: Roy Naisbitt, English animator and layout artist (A Christmas Carol, Who Framed Roger Rabbit, Balto, Space Jam, The Last Belle), dies at age 90.
 April 29: Billie Hayes, American actress (voice of Orgoch in The Black Cauldron, Mother Mae-Eye in Teen Titans and Teen Titans Go!, Granny Applecheeks in The Grim Adventures of Billy & Mandy), dies at age 96.

May
 May 1:
 Olympia Dukakis, American actress (voice of Zelda in The Simpsons episode "The Old Man and the Key"), dies at age 89.
 Sam Cornell, American animator (George of the Jungle, The Hugga Bunch, Jetsons: The Movie, animated the main titles for The Wuzzles and The New Woody Woodpecker Show), background artist (Shinbone Alley), storyboard artist (George of the Jungle, The Rugrats Movie), writer and director (The New 3 Stooges), dies at age 82.
 May 4: Mark Barrows, American animator (BraveStarr, Walt Disney Animation Studios, The Simpsons Movie), dies at age 60.
 May 7: Tawny Kitaen, American actress, model and media personality (voice of Annabelle in Eek! The Cat), dies from dilated cardiomyopathy at age 59.
 May 10: Mike Yang, American animatic editor (Adelaide Productions, Family Guy, American Dad!, Ben 10: Omniverse), dies at an unknown age.
 May 13: Olivier Jean-Marie, French animator (Robo Story, Albert the 5th Musketeer, Dr. Zitbag's Transylvania Pet Shop), background artist (Clémentine), storyboard artist (Spiff and Hercules, Li'l Elvis and the Truckstoppers, Snow White: The Sequel), writer (Rabbids Invasion) and director (Les Minikeums, Xilam, creator of Zig & Sharko, co-creator of Rolling with the Ronks!), dies from cancer at age 60.
 May 15: Marisha Noroski, American animation checker (Pac-Man, BraveStarr, Warner Bros. Feature Animation, Eight Crazy Nights), dies at an unknown age.
 May 19: David Anthony Kraft, American comics writer, critic, publisher and animation screenwriter (G.I. Joe Extreme, Street Fighter), dies at age 68.
 May 23: Eric Carle, American author, designer and illustrator (The Very Hungry Caterpillar and Other Stories), dies from kidney failure at age 91.
 May 24: Samuel E. Wright, American actor and singer (voice of Sebastian in The Little Mermaid franchise, Kron in Dinosaur), dies from prostate cancer at age 74.
 May 26: Paul Soles, Canadian actor (voice of Hermey in Rudolph the Red-Nosed Reindeer, Spider-Man in Spider-Man), dies at age 90.
 May 27: Phillip Young, American animator (Walt Disney Animation Studios, Sinbad: Legend of the Seven Seas, Looney Tunes: Back in Action), dies at age 80.
 May 29:
 Marcell Jankovics, Hungarian graphic artist, film director, and author (Sisyphus, The Struggle), dies at age 79.
 Gavin MacLeod, American actor (voice of Captain Gumble in the Pound Puppies episode "Bone Voyage"), dies at age 90.
 May 30: Don Duga, American designer, storyboard artist, director and educator (Frosty the Snowman, The Little Drummer Boy, The Last Unicorn), dies at age 87.
 May 31: Arlene Golonka, American actress (voice of Debbie in Speed Buggy), dies at age 85.

June 
 June 6: Ron Allen, American production assistant (The Little Mermaid, FernGully: The Last Rainforest), dies at an unknown age.
 June 7: Larry Gelman, American actor (voice of Young Quist in the Freakazoid! episode "Lawn Gnomes: Chapter IV – Fun in the Sun"), dies at age 90.
 June 11: Kay Hawtrey, Canadian actress (voice of Emily's Grandmother in Little Bear, Grandma in Max & Ruby, Miss Primrose in The Raccoons episode "Making the Grade!"), dies at age 94.
 June 13: Ned Beatty, American actor (voice of Lotso in Toy Story 3, Tortoise John in Rango), dies at age 83.

July 
 July 1: Philece Sampler, American actress (voice of Mimi Tachikawa in the Digimon franchise, Betty Ross in The Incredible Hulk, Kelly in Transformers: Robots in Disguise, Binka in Shinzo, Makimachi Misao in Rurouni Kenshin, Lester Goldberg in Stanley, Silvia in Viewtiful Joe, Beauty in Bobobo-bo Bo-bobo, Jimera in Duel Masters, Hiyori Tamura in Lucky Star, Toph Beifong in The Legend of Korra, Sabine Cheng and Ms. Mendeleiev in Miraculous: Tales of Ladybug & Cat Noir, Granny and Mother Goose in Goldie & Bear, Rumy, Hermit Crab and Sea Turtle in Treehouse Detectives, Fantine and Cosette in the Duckman episode "Psyche", Francine in the All Grown Up! episode "Fools Rush In", Mildred Scalise in The Loud House episode "Recipe for Disaster"), dies from a heart attack at age 67.
 July 3: Dave Thomson, American animator and scene-planner (Walt Disney Animation Studios, Bebe's Kids, The Pagemaster, Cats Don't Dance), dies at age 75.
 July 7: Chick Vennera, American actor (voice of Pesto in Animaniacs, Lorenzo in The Real Adventures of Jonny Quest, Chauffeur in Batman Beyond, Ferrett in Static Shock), dies from cancer at age 74.
July 13: Don Jurwich, American animation writer, director and producer (Hanna-Barbera, Marvel Productions), dies at age 87.
 July 16: Biz Markie, American rapper, DJ and record producer (portrayed himself in the "Biz's Beat" segment of Yo Gabba Gabba!, voice of Beatbox Baggins, Odie's Security Guard and Elf in Mad, Tiny Timmy Scratch It in the Randy Cunningham: 9th Grade Ninja episode "Hip Hopocalypse Now", Snorlock in the Adventure Time episode "Slow Love", the title character in the SpongeBob SquarePants episode "Kenny the Cat", performed the song "That's The Way (I Like It)" in Space Jam), dies from a stroke at age 57.
 July 20: Jerry Granelli, American-Canadian jazz drummer (A Charlie Brown Christmas), dies at age 80.
 July 22: Noreen Beasley, American character designer and inbetweener (Ruby-Spears Enterprises, Walt Disney Animation Studios), dies at an unknown age.
 July 24:
 Jackie Mason, American comedian and actor (voice of Rabbi Hyman Krustofski in The Simpsons, The Sandman in The Fairly OddParents episode "Beddy Bye"), dies at age 93.
 Alfie Scopp, English-Canadian voice actor (voice of Charlie-in-The-Box in Rudolph the Red-Nosed Reindeer), dies at age 101.
 July 28:
 Ron Popeil, American inventor and marketing personality (voiced himself in the Futurama episode "A Big Piece of Garbage"), dies from a brain hemorrhage at age 86.
 Julie Benenati, American animation checker (Cartoon Network Studios), dies at age 51.
 July 30: Thea White, American voice actress (voice of Muriel Bagge in Courage the Cowardly Dog and Straight Outta Nowhere: Scooby-Doo! Meets Courage the Cowardly Dog), dies at age 81.

August
 August 3: Fred Ladd, American writer and producer (American dubs of Astro Boy, Gigantor, Kimba the White Lion, creative consultant for the DiC dub of Sailor Moon), dies at age 94.
 August 7: Jane Withers, American actress (voice of Laverne in The Hunchback of Notre Dame and The Hunchback of Notre Dame II), dies at age 95.
 August 9: Zairaini Sarbini, Malaysian voice actress (dub voice of Candace Flynn in Phineas and Ferb, Sam in Totally Spies, Conan Edogawa in Case Closed, Sakura Haruno and Hinata Hyuga in Naruto, Katara in Avatar: The Last Airbender, and Sandy Cheeks in SpongeBob SquarePants), dies at age 48.
 August 10: Giorgio Lopez, Italian voice actor (dub voice of King Harold in the Shrek franchise and Scrooge McDuck from Disney), dies at age 74.
August 12: Peter R. Brown, Canadian-American animator (Ferngully: The Last Rainforest, A Goofy Movie, The Little Lulu Show, All Dogs Go to Heaven 2, Space Jam) and overseas supervisor (Recess, Lilo & Stitch: The Series, Lloyd in Space, Family Guy), dies from cancer at an unknown age.
 August 13: Robert E. Stanton, American background artist (Filmation, Alvin and the Chipmunks, Walt Disney Animation Studios, Curious George), dies at age 60.
 August 14: Enzo Facciolo, Italian comics artist and animator (worked for Toni Pagot), dies at age 89.
 August 17: Masami Suda, Japanese animator and character designer (Fist of the North Star, Slam Dunk, Speed Racer), dies at age 77.
 August 21: Fernando Ruiz Álvarez, Mexican animator (The Sword in the Stone) and director (Los Tres Reyes Magos, La Bruja Chiriloca, Los Telerines, The Adventures of Oliver Twist), dies from a heart attack at age 79.
 August 26: French Tickner, American actor (English voice of Kagome's grandfather in Inuyasha, Watari in Death Note), dies at age 91.
 August 28: Jacques Drouin, Canadian animator and director (National Film Board of Canada), dies at age 78.
 August 29:
 Ed Asner, American actor and president of the Screen Actors Guild (voice of Carl Fredricksen in Up, Sergeant Cosgrove in Freakazoid! and the Teen Titans Go! episode "Huggbees", Roland Daggett in Batman: The Animated Series, Hudson in Gargoyles, Granny Goodness in Superman: The Animated Series, Justice League Unlimited, and Superman/Batman: Apocalypse, J. Jonah Jameson in Spider-Man, Santa Claus in Elf: Buddy's Musical Christmas, Regular Show, Olive, the Other Reindeer, and The Story of Santa Claus, Mr. Leonard in Foodfight!, Kent Nelson in the Young Justice episode "Denial"), dies at age 91.
 Jamie Kezlarian Bolio, American marketer and animator (Rocko's Modern Life, We're Back! A Dinosaur's Story, Walt Disney Animation Studios, The Illusionist), dies at age 54.
 August 30: Linda Kahn, American television executive (Nickelodeon, Scholastic Entertainment), dies from breast cancer at age 72.
 August 31: Theresa Plummer-Andrews, English animation television producer (CBBC), dies at age 77.

September 
 September 6: Michael K. Williams, American actor, dancer, model and choreographer (voice of Lucius in High School USA!, Satan and Nigerian Dude in Lucas Bros. Moving Co., Smokey Greenwood in F Is for Family, Unnamed Citizen in the Aqua Teen Hunger Force episode "Allen Part Two"), dies from a drug overdose at age 54. 
 September 7: Eiichi Yamamoto, Japanese animation director and screenwriter (Kimba the White Lion, Cleopatra, Belladonna of Sadness), dies at age 80.
 September 9: Marion Wells, American television writer (Hanna-Barbera, Disney Television Animation, Adventures from the Book of Virtues), dies at age 73.
 September 14: Norm Macdonald, Canadian comedian, writer and actor (voice of Death in Family Guy, Norm the Genie in The Fairly OddParents, Pigeon in Mike Tyson Mysteries, Glumshanks in Skylanders Academy, Mogens in Klaus), dies at age 61.
 September 18: Leo De Lyon, American actor (voice of Spook and Brain in Top Cat, Flunky in The Jungle Book), dies at age 96.
 September 23:
 David H. DePatie, American film and television producer (Last executive of Warner Bros Cartoons, co-founder of DePatie-Freleng Enterprises and executive producer at Marvel Productions), dies at age 91.
 Troy A. Gustafson, American animator (Walt Disney Animation Studios), dies from leukemia at age 59.
 September 24: Takao Saitō, Japanese manga artist (Golgo 13), dies at age 84.
 September 28: Myrna Gibbs, American ink & paint artist (The Flintstones, DePatie-Freleng Enterprises, Marvel Productions, Peanuts specials), dies at age 84.
 September 29: Mike Renzi, American composer, music director, pianist and jazz musician (Sesame Street), dies at age 80.
 September 30: Koichi Sugiyama, Japanese music composer (Cyborg 009, Space Runaway Ideon, Dragon Quest: The Adventure of Dai), dies at age 90.

October 
 October 5: 
 Kathleen Quaife-Hodge, American animator (Walt Disney Animation Studios, Sullivan Bluth Studios, Universal Cartoon Studios, FernGully: The Last Rainforest, The Thief and the Cobbler, Asterix Conquers America, The Pagemaster, Warner Bros. Feature Animation, Hanna-Barbera, Nickelodeon Animation Studio, God, the Devil and Bob, The Proud Family, I Want a Dog for Christmas, Charlie Brown, Mickey, Donald, Goofy: The Three Musketeers, Da Boom Crew, Bah, Humduck! A Looney Tunes Christmas, Slacker Cats), dies at age 64.
 Pavao Štalter, Croatian animator, director, screenwriter, scenographer and artist, dies at age 92.
 October 10: Ruthie Tompson, American animator and camera technician (Walt Disney Animation Studios), dies at age 111.
 October 11: Brian Goldner, American business chief executive and film producer (CEO of Hasbro from 2008 to 2021), dies from prostate cancer at age 58.
 October 16:
 Denise Bryer, English voice actress (voice of Twizzle in The Adventures of Twizzle, Commander Makara in Star Fleet, Noddy in The Noddy Shop), dies at age 93.
 Lew Ott, American animator (Hanna-Barbera, Hot Wheels, Fritz the Cat), character designer (Hanna-Barbera, Filmation, Marvel Productions), background artist (The Transformers: The Movie, G.I. Joe: The Movie, Hanna-Barbera) and production designer (Ruby-Spears Enterprises), dies at age 94.
 October 18: Christopher Ayres, American voice actor and ADR director (Dragon Ball Z Kai, Gantz, Dragon Ball Super), dies at age 56.
 October 19: Jack Angel, American voice actor (voice of Hawkman, Flash, and Samurai in Super Friends, King Zarkon in Voltron, Ramjet, Astrotrain, and various other characters in The Transformers, Liquidator in Darkwing Duck, Chunk in Toy Story 3, Comrade Chaos in El Tigre: The Adventures of Manny Rivera, Nick Fury in Spider-Man, Thor in Spider-Man, Technorg in the Ben 10 episode "Grudge Match"), dies at age 90.
 October 20: Sean Gallimore, American animator (Thumbelina, A Troll in Central Park, The Pagemaster, Walt Disney Animation Studios, Looney Tunes: Back in Action, Space Jam: A New Legacy), dies at age 56.
 October 21: Saori Sugimoto, Japanese voice actress (voice of Sanae Minami in Green Green, Catherine Bloom in Mobile Suit Gundam Wing, Ramurin Makiba and Nyakkii Momoyama in Shima Shima Tora no Shimajirō), dies at age 58.
 October 22:
 Marlene Robinson May, American animator and sheet timer (Alvin and the Chipmunks, DuckTales, Darkwing Duck, CatDog, Ed, Edd n Eddy), dies at age 82.
 Peter Scolari, American actor (voice of John Hammer and The Shark/Gunther Hardwicke in Batman: The Animated Series, Preston Vogel in Gargoyles, Brad in the Duckman episode "From Brad to Worse", Wilford B. Wolf in the Animaniacs episode "Moon Over Minerva", Professor Higgenson in the What's New, Scooby-Doo? episode "Scooby-Doo Christmas", Ray Palmer/Atom in the Batman: The Brave and the Bold episode "Sword of the Atom!"), dies at age 66.
 October 27: Lynn Spees, American animator (The Secret of NIMH, FernGully: The Last Rainforest), dies at age 76.
 October 29: Yoshiko Ota, Japanese voice actress ((voice of Nobita in Doraemon, Urasae in Inuyasha, Peebo in Choudenshi Bioman, Akko Kagami in Akko's Secret), dies at age 89.

November 
 November 3: Bob Baker, English screenwriter (Wallace & Gromit), dies at age 82.
 November 5: Kinji Yoshimoto, Japanese animator, film director (Legend of Lemnear, I Couldn't Become a Hero, So I Reluctantly Decided to Get a Job., Unbreakable Machine-Doll, Seven Mortal Sins) and composer, dies at age 55.
 November 7: Dean Stockwell, American actor (voice of Duke Nukem in Captain Planet and the Planeteers, adult Tim Drake in Batman Beyond: Return of the Joker), dies at age 85.
 November 10: Chris Duncan, American background painter, visual effects artist and designer (Warner Bros. Animation, Nickelodeon Animation Studio), dies at age 58.
 November 11: Graeme Edge, English musician, songwriter and poet (voiced himself in The Simpsons episode "Viva Ned Flanders"), dies from metastatic cancer at age 80.
 November 13:
 David Fox, Canadian actor (voice of Captain Haddock in The Adventures of Tintin, Sentinels and Master Mold in X-Men), dies from cancer at age 80.
 Joe Siracusa, American film and music editor (Popeye the Sailor, What's New, Mr. Magoo?, The Alvin Show, DePatie-Freleng Enterprises, Marvel Productions), dies at age 99.
 November 17: Dave Frishberg, American composer and lyricist (wrote "I'm Just a Bill" from Schoolhouse Rock!), dies at age 88.
 November 18: Keith Dinicol, Canadian actor (voice of Willow 1 in Anne of Green Gables: The Animated Series), dies from a stroke at age 69.
 November 19: Will Ryan, American voice actor, singer and musician (voice of Petrie in The Land Before Time, Willie the Giant in Mickey's Christmas Carol, House of Mouse, and Mickey Mouse Clubhouse, Scrooge McDuck in Sport Goofy in Soccermania, Pete in DuckTales and Mickey's Christmas Carol, Grubby in The Adventures of Teddy Ruxpin, The Seahorse Herald in The Little Mermaid, the title characters in the Courage the Cowardly Dog episode "The Duck Brothers", various characters in Hi Hi Puffy AmiYumi), dies at age 72.
 November 20: Nobuaki Sekine, Japanese voice actor (.hack//Legend of the Twilight), dies from a cerebral infarction at age 87.
 November 22: Doug MacLeod, Australian author and screenwriter (co-creator of Dogstar), dies at age 62.
 November 26: Stephen Sondheim, American composer and lyricist (voiced himself and composed the song "The Ballad of Buzz Cola" in The Simpsons episode "Yokel Chords"), dies at age 91.

December 
 December 1: Keiko Nobumoto, Japanese screenwriter (Cowboy Bebop, Samurai Champloo, Wolf's Rain, Tokyo Godfathers), dies at age 57.
 December 3: Jōji Yanami, Japanese voice actor (Inuyasha, One Piece, Dragon Ball Z) and narrator (Dragon Ball), dies at age 90.
 December 4: Tom Shannon, American animator (Filmation, The Super Mario Bros. Super Show!, Walt Disney Animation Studios), dies at age 71.
 December 5: Scott Page-Pagter, American voice actor, television producer, composer, sound effects artist and voice director (Saban Entertainment), dies at age 52.
 December 8: Mitsutoshi Furuya, Japanese manga artist (Dame Oyaji), dies at age 85.
 December 13:
 Giannalberto Bendazzi, Italian animation historian (Cartoons - 100 Years of Cinema Animation), dies at age 75.
 Vera Lanpher-Pacheco, American animator (Walt Disney Animation Studios) and voice actor (voice of Daphne in Dragon's Lair), dies at age 66.
 Andrey Ignatenko, Russian animator (The Tale of Tsar Saltan, The Adventures of Lolo the Penguin, Varga Studio), dies at age 64.
 December 16:
 Gérald Forton, Belgian-born French comic book artist, animator (The Legend of White Fang, Skeleton Warriors), storyboard artist (Kid 'n Play, The Legend of Prince Valiant, Wild West C.O.W.-Boys of Moo Mesa, Red Planet, Rugrats, Skeleton Warriors, Darkstalkers, X-Men: The Animated Series, Road Rovers, Street Fighter, Extreme Ghostbusters, Men in Black: The Series, The Prince of Atlantis, Invasion America, RoboCop: Alpha Commando, The King and I), character designer (Filmation, DIC Entertainment, James Bond Jr.), background artist (The Pirates of Dark Water, Tiny Toon Adventures, Teenage Mutant Ninja Turtles, The Prince of Atlantis) and production designer (Filmation), dies at age 90.
 Derrick J. Wyatt, American character designer (Warner Bros. Animation, Cartoon Network Studios, Bless the Harts) and storyboard artist (The Ripping Friends), dies at age 49.
 Catherine Peterson, American ink & paint artist (Hanna-Barbera, The Secret of NIMH, Shelley Duvall's Bedtime Stories, Cool World) and animation checker (Hanna-Barbera, Walt Disney Animation Studios), dies at age 66.
 December 17: Frank Mula, American television writer and producer (The Simpsons), dies at age 71.
 December 19: Sayaka Kanda, Japanese actress and singer (dub voice of Anna in the Frozen franchise), dies at age 35.
 December 22: Kirk Benson, American film editor (King of the Hill, American Dad!, The Cleveland Show, Family Guy), dies at age 60.
 December 24: Barry Bruce, American animation director and designer (Will Vinton Studios, Return to Oz, Sesame Street), dies at age 77.
 December 25: Michael Camarillo, American animator (Bebe's Kids, The Swan Princess, Quest for Camelot, The Road to El Dorado, Spirit: Stallion of the Cimarron, The Powerpuff Girls Movie), background artist (The Simpsons) and prop designer (Foster's Home for Imaginary Friends, Sym-Bionic Titan), dies from an undiagnosed heart condition at age 57.
 December 28: John Madden, American football player, coach and sports commentator (voiced himself in The Simpsons episode "Sunday, Cruddy Sunday"), dies at age 85.
 December 30:
 Stephen J. Lawrence, American composer (Sesame Street, The Wubbulous World of Dr. Seuss), dies at age 82.
 David Schwartz, American animator, storyboard artist (ALF Tales, The Real Ghostbusters, The Simpsons, Disney Television Animation, Yo Yogi!, Warner Bros. Animation, Rugrats, Fantastic Four, The Incredible Hulk, Clerks: The Animated Series, Courage the Cowardly Dog, X-Men: Evolution, Tutenstein, Curious George, Class of 3000, TMNT, The Spectacular Spider-Man, Wolverine and the X-Men, Sit Down, Shut Up, Ben 10: Destroy All Aliens, Sheriff Callie's Wild West, Doc McStuffins, The VeggieTales Show), writer (Johnny Bravo, Ben 10, New Looney Tunes) and director (Captain Simian & the Space Monkeys, Jumanji, Channel Umptee-3, Johnny Bravo), dies at age 67.
 December 31: Betty White, American actress and comedian (voice of Gretchen Claus in The Story of Santa Claus, Dorothy in The Lionhearts, Aunt Polly in Tom Sawyer, Sophie Hunter in The Wild Thornberrys, Delia, Dorothy and Ellen in King of the Hill, Grandmama in Higglytown Heroes, Yoshie in Ponyo, Dora and Grandma Sheila Martin in Glenn Martin, DDS, Mrs. Claus in Prep & Landing: Operation: Secret Santa, Agatha McLeish in Pound Puppies, Grammy Norma in The Lorax, Bitey White in Toy Story 4 and the Forky Asks a Question episode "What is Love?", Mrs. Sarah Vanderwhoozie in Trouble, Hestia in the Hercules episode "Hercules and the Tiff on Olympus", Granny in the Teacher's Pet episode "The Turkey That Came for Dinner", Mrs. Doolin in the Grim & Evil episode "Who Killed Who?", Gary's Mother in the Gary the Rat episode "This Is Not a Pipe", Grandma Wilson in the Father of the Pride episode "Donkey", Old Lady in the Mickey Mouse episode "New York Weenie", Beatrice in the SpongeBob SquarePants episode "Mall Girl Pearl", herself in The Simpsons episodes "Missionary: Impossible" and "Homerazzi", and the Family Guy episode "Peterotica"), dies from a stroke at age 99.

Specific date unknown
 Dean Spille, American background artist (Peanuts specials, Frosty Returns, Bucky O'Hare and the Toad Wars, Garfield and Friends), dies at age 94.
 Steve McGrath, American modeler (Toy Story 2, DreamWorks Animation), dies at an unknown age.
 F.T. Ziegler, American camera operator (Filmation, Once Upon a Forest), dies at an unknown age.
 Dick Robbins, American television writer (Spider-Man, Hanna-Barbera, The Transformers, Defenders of the Earth), dies at an unknown age.

See also
 2021 in anime
 List of animated television series of 2021

References

External links 
Animated works of the year, listed in the IMDb

 
Mass media timelines by year
Animation